Strabomantis cadenai is a species of frog in the family Strabomantidae. It is endemic to Colombia. Its natural habitat is subtropical or tropical moist montane forest. It is threatened by habitat loss.

References

cadenai
Amphibians of Colombia
Endemic fauna of Colombia
Amphibians described in 1986
Taxonomy articles created by Polbot